Bonayan Al-Dosari (born 11 August 1972) is a Saudi Arabian weightlifter. He competed in the 1996 Summer Olympics.

References

1972 births
Living people
Weightlifters at the 1996 Summer Olympics
Saudi Arabian male weightlifters
Olympic weightlifters of Saudi Arabia
20th-century Saudi Arabian people